Franklin Elementary School is an often-used name in the United States to honor Benjamin Franklin, a popular founding father.  The name may refer to;

United States schools by state
Franklin Elementary School (Corona, California), Corona-Norco Unified School District
Franklin Elementary School (Burlingame, California)
Franklin Elementary School (Franklin, Sacramento County, California), Elk Grove Unified School District
Franklin Elementary School (Long Beach, California), Long Beach, California
Franklin Elementary School (Loomis, California), Loomis Union School District, Loomis, California
Franklin Elementary School (Oakland, California), 
Franklin Elementary School (Redlands, California), Redlands, California
Franklin Elementary School (San Diego, California), San Diego Unified School District
Franklin Elementary School (Santa Ana, California)
Franklin Elementary School (Santa Monica, California), Santa Monica, California
Franklin Elementary School (East Chicago, Indiana), East Chicago, Indiana
Franklin Elementary School (Vincennes, Indiana), Vincennes, Indiana
Franklin Elementary School (Muscatine, Iowa), Muscatine, Iowa
Franklin Elementary School (Reisterstown, Maryland)
Franklin Elementary School (North Andover, Massachusetts), North Andover, Massachusetts
Franklin Elementary School (Detroit, Michigan) Detroit Public Schools 
Franklin Elementary School (Royal Oak, Michigan), Royal Oak Public Schools
Franklin Elementary School (Anoka, Minnesota), Anoka, Minnesota
Franklin Elementary School (Columbus, Mississippi), Columbus, Mississippi
Franklin Elementary School (Liberty, Missouri) Liberty Public Schools
Franklin Elementary School (Missoula, Montana) Missoula County Public Schools
Franklin Elementary School (Omaha, Nebraska), Omaha Public Schools
Franklin Elementary School (Summit, New Jersey), Summit, New Jersey
Franklin Elementary School (Westfield, New Jersey)
Franklin Elementary School (Syracuse, New York)
Franklin Elementary School (Franklin Park, Pennsylvania)
Franklin Elementary School (Franklin, Tennessee) Franklin Special School District
Franklin Elementary School (Houston, Texas) Houston Independent School District
Franklin Elementary School (Kirkland, Washington)
Franklin Elementary School (Pullman, Washington), Pullman, Washington
Franklin Elementary School (Spokane, Washington), listed on the National Register of Historic Places
Franklin Elementary School (Tacoma, Washington), Tacoma School District
Franklin Elementary School (Pendleton County, West Virginia), Pendleton County, West Virginia
Franklin Elementary School (Madison, Wisconsin), Madison Metropolitan School District
Franklin Elementary School (West Allis, Wisconsin) West Allis - West Milwaukee School District